Prime Minister Cup Women's National Tournament is a twenty20 cricket tournament in Nepal organised by the Cricket Association of Nepal. There are currently eight teams participating in the tournament. The inaugural edition was contested among 10 teams and six teams contested the tournament from 2016 to 2018.

Teams

Defunct teams 

 Region-I (Biratnagar)
 Region-II (Birgunj)
 Region-III (Kathmandu)
 Region-IV (Bhairahawa)
 Region-V (Nepalgunj)

 Region-VI (Baitadi)
 Region-VII (Janakpur)
 Region-VIII (Pokhara)
 Region-XI (Dhangadhi)
 Eastern Region

 Central Region
 Western Region
 Mid-Western Region
 Far-Western Region

Tournament season and results

Team's performance 

 Legend

  – Champion
  – Runner-up
  – Semi-final
 GS – Group stage

References 

Nepalese domestic cricket competitions
Women's Twenty20 cricket competitions
2015 establishments in Nepal
Recurring sporting events established in 2015